Q.E.D. is a 1982 adventure television series set in Edwardian England, starring Sam Waterston as Professor Quentin Everett Deverill. The Professor was a scientific detective in the mold of Sherlock Holmes, and the series had a smattering of what would later be called steampunk. In the show, the lead character was known primarily by his initials, Q.E.D; the reference here is that Q.E.D. usually stands for quod erat demonstrandum, a statement signalling the end of a proof.
However, characters would sometimes state the initials to represent "quite easily done." The series was broadcast during March and April, 1982 on the CBS television  network in the United States, and by a variety of ITV companies in the United Kingdom.

Characters
 Prof. Quentin E. Deverill (Sam Waterston)
 Phipps (George Innes)
 Charlie Andrews (A.C. Weary)
 Betsy Stephens (Sarah Berger; episode 1 only)
 Jenny Martin (Caroline Langrishe; episodes 2–6 only)
 Dr. Stefan Kilkiss (Julian Glover; episodes 1, 2 and 4 only)

Episodes

External links

1982 American television series debuts
1982 American television series endings
American adventure television series
CBS original programming
Steampunk television series
Television series set in the 1910s
Television shows set in England